The Clarke–Palmore House, also known as Clarke Home, was built as a brick farmhouse in 1819 and expanded in 1855.  
Its first floor level, built in 1819, is described as being American bond brickwork of 3 to 5 stretcher courses between each header course.  Its upper level, built in 1855, is of American bond with 6 to 7 stretcher courses between each header course.

It was listed on the National Register of Historic Places in 2004.

The house and pumphouse on its property are "a reminder of Henrico County's agricultural past." They are owned by Henrico County and open to the public for events and by appointment as a 1930s period farmhouse.

References

External links
 Clarke–Palmore House Museum – Henrico County Recreation and Parks

Houses on the National Register of Historic Places in Virginia
Houses completed in 1819
Houses in Henrico County, Virginia
National Register of Historic Places in Henrico County, Virginia
Museums in Henrico County, Virginia
Historic house museums in Virginia